Patagotitan is a genus of titanosaurian sauropod dinosaur from the Cerro Barcino Formation in Chubut Province, Patagonia, Argentina. The genus contains a single species known from at least six young adult individuals, Patagotitan mayorum, which was first announced in 2014 and then validly named in 2017 by José Carballido and colleagues. Still, Patagotitan is one of the most completely-known titanosaurs, and so its interrelationships with other titanosaurs have been relatively consistent in phylogenetic analyses. This led to its use in a re-definition of the group Colossosauria by Carballido and colleagues in 2022.

Like Argentinosaurus and other members of the Lognkosauria, Patagotitan was a particularly large and robust titanosaur. Several unique features in the limbs were also likely attachment scars for muscles. In life, Patagotitan lived in a forested region on a floodplain that was dominated by coniferous trees.

Discovery 

This discovery was reported to P. Huerta at the Museum of Paleontology Egidio Feruglio (MPEF) in Trelew. One preliminary field expedition to the La Flecha site was carried out in late 2012 by the MPEF, followed by seven further expeditions that discovered new fossils between January 2013 and February 2015. The lead scientists on the excavation were Jose Luis Carballido and Diego Pol, with partial funding from The Jurassic Foundation. More than 200 fossils, including 130 sauropod bones and 57 theropod teeth, were uncovered. The rock layers at the La Flecha site belong to the Cerro Castaño Member of the Cerro Barcino Formation, and were specifically dated to approximately 101.62 million years in age (corresponding to the latest Albian age of the Cretaceous).

The collected sauropod fossils were organized into six partial skeletons, which likely belonged to the same species due to uniformity in their morphology and size (with all individuals differing no more than 5% in length). Although the remains all came from the same quarry, the individuals likely did not all die at the same time. Within the  sediment layer containing the fossils, there are three distinct but closely-spaced levels corresponding to three burial events, which are named FLV1, FLV2, and FLV3. One skeleton from FLV3 was designated as the holotype specimen of a new species, and was catalogued as MPEF-PV 3400. The skeleton was chosen to be the holotype because it was the best preserved and also the one showing the most distinguishing traits.

Other specimens were designated as the paratypes. Based on overlapping elements, these include at least three individuals from FLV1, one from FLV2, and one from FLV3 other than the holotype. MPEF-PV 3372 (from FLV1) is a tooth. MPEF-PV 3393 (not associated with a layer) is a rear tail vertebra. MPEF-PV 3395 and MPEV-PV 3396 (both from FLV1) are left , while MPEF-PV 3397 (from FLV2) is a right humerus. MPEF-PV 3375 (FLV3) is a left femur while MPEF-PV 3394 (FLV1) is a right femur. MPEF-PV 3391 and MPEF-PV 3392 (both from FLV1) represent two .

In 2017, José Luis Carballido, Diego Pol, Alejandro Otero, Ignacio Alejandro Cerda, Leonardo Salgado, Alberto Carlos Garrido, Jahandar Ramezani, Néstor Ruben Cúneo and Javier Marcelo Krause named these remains as the type species of a new genus, Patagotitan mayorum. Collectively, the known remains made Patagotitan one of the most completely-known members of the Titanosauria. The generic name combines a reference to Patagonia with a Greek Titan for the "strength and large size" of this titanosaur. The specific name honours the Mayo family, owners of La Flecha ranch.

Display 

Skeletal mounts based on all available material of Patagotitan are displayed in multiple museums. Research Casting International digitally scanned the specimens, which was followed by the creation of foam molds, fiberglass casts, and 3D printing. One mount is exhibited in the Museum of Paleontology Egidio Feruglio. Another is exhibited in the American Museum of Natural History, where it replaced a juvenile Barosaurus mount. Some of the original fossils, including a femur, were also on display briefly. Lastly, one is exhibited in the Field Museum of Natural History, where it replaced the Sue specimen of Tyrannosaurus (which has been moved to another exhibit). From March 2023 until January 2024, it is planned to display one at the Natural History Museum, London.

Description

Size 

Like other titanosaur sauropods, Patagotitan was a quadrupedal herbivore with a long neck and tail and is notable for its large size. Carballido and colleagues stated in the media:
 

These estimates suggested that Patagotitan was 10% larger than Argentinosaurus. Histology of five femora and one humerus indicates that the individuals died while they were young adults, with growth having slowed but not ceased entirely.

Following the initial publication of Patagotitan in 2017, science writer Riley Black and paleontologist Matt Wedel cautioned against the reported estimates. In blog posts, Wedel noted that based on available measurements Patagotitan was comparable in size with other known giant titanosaurs. However, almost every measurement that could be compared was larger in Argentinosaurus. Wedel also criticised the polygon-based method that Carballido and colleagues used to compare the sizes of Patagotitan and Argentinosaurus vertebrae, noting that the former was largely empty space. In 2019, Paul noted that the articulated length of the back vertebrae was larger in Argentinosaurus than in Patagotitan, making it impossible for Patagotitan to have had a larger torso. For Patagotitan to have been larger, he reasoned that the rest of its body would have to have been improbably large, or vice versa in Argentinosaurus. He attributed this conclusion to a lack of proper measurement techniques. Also, he criticized the 3D model used for the volumetric estimate 
as having a flat-sided torso, and noted that the neck and tail were reconstructed as being fairly long.

Vertebrae 

By contrast, the rear neck vertebrae of Patagotitan had deep pleurocoels that opened from the sides into the interior of the bone; whether the neural spines of these vertebrae were horizontally expanded as in Futalognkosaurus, Ligabuesaurus, and Mendozasaurus cannot be determined.

Like Futalognkosaurus and other titanosaurs that preserved a complete set of back vertebrae, Patagotitan probably had 10. Several characteristics in the back vertebrae distinguished Patagotitan from other titanosaurs. The , ridges of bone crossing the vertebrae, were thin and strongly developed in the back vertebrae of Patagotitan, unlike Argentinosaurus and Puertasaurus. The PRDLs usually instead extended forward from the diapophyses in other sauropods. All of the neural spines in the back were tall and vertical in Patagotitan, and the first few had expanded, arrow-shaped ends. Argentinosaurus had front neural spines with arrow-shaped ends, but like other members of the Titanosauriformes the rear neural spines were inclined backwards; Patagotitan represents a reversal to the condition in non-titanosauriforms. Dreadnoughtus, Puertasaurus, and other members of the Lognkosauria had short front neural spines lacking the arrow-shaped ends. Uniquely, in the first two back vertebrae, the prespinal laminae that ran alongside the front of the neural spines bulged outwards near the bottom. Hyposphene-hypantrum articulations to stiffen the vertebrae were primitively present among sauropods and lost multiple times, but Patagotitan is the first known sauropod where they were retained between only one pair of vertebrae. Because the shoulder blade was located at this position, this may have been a weight-bearing adaptation.

Uniquely in Patagotitan, the front articulating surface of the first tail vertebra was flat. Also uniquely, the neural spines of the front tail vertebrae were about four to six times as wide from side to side as they were long front to back, contrasting with the condition in Dreadnoughtus, Epachthosaurus, and Malawisaurus where they were longer front to back. They were also tall, being 1.5 times taller than the underlying  (vertebral bodies). Yet another unique characteristic was that the tops of the neural spines were concave, making them somewhat bifurcated with the tips curling forwards. On the neural spine, longitudinal laminae separated from the prespinal and postspinal laminae, which was previously only seen in Bonitasaura. At the sides of the front tail vertebrae, the transverse processes (on which the diapophyses were located) were high and thin, like Futalognkosaurus and Mendozasaurus but unlike Dreadnoughtus and other titanosaurs. Unlike the Diplodocidae, where the transverse processes of the front tail vertebrae formed wing-like shapes, they were wider at the bottom in Patagotitan. These expanded transverse processes would have resulted in greater attachment areas for the caudofemoralis longus, ilio-ischiocaudalis, and spinalis muscles, and therefore a more muscular tail. Also like Futalognkosaurus, Mendozasaurus, and Drusilasaura, well-developed spinodiapophyseal laminae (SDLs) ran from the neural spines down the tranverse processes to the diapophyses.

Limbs and limb girdles 

Patagotitan had a robust, expanded scapula, with the blade being only 4.15 times as long as it was wide at its narrowest point; except for Drusilasaura, Isisaurus, Neuquensaurus, and Saltasaurus, this figure was usually considerably higher among the Macronaria. Furthermore, expansion was present at both ends such that the top end of the scapula was roughly at the same level as the bottom end, which was an uncommon characteristic also seen in Isisaurus. However, like other titanosaurs, the  ridge was about 30% as long as the scapula. In addition to a projection at the bottom of the scapula just behind the shoulder joint, which was common among titanosaurs, there was a second one further back at the beginning of the blade, only seen otherwise in Alamosaurus, Dreadnoughtus, Drusilasaura, Elaltitan, and Sauroposeidon. Furthermore, in addition to a ridge that ran along the midline of the blade parallel to the bottom, there was a second ridge that ran upwards diagonally to the top of the bone, which was unique to Patagotitan. The articulating surface of the coracoid with the scapula was 80% as long front-to-back as it was tall, an uncommon characteristic shared with Giraffatitan, Ruyangosaurus, and Tapuiasaurus. Like other titanosauriforms, the sternal plates were crescent-shaped with the outer edge being slightly concave (more like Dreadnoughtus and Savannasaurus than the Saltasauridae, in which it was strongly concave). There was a ridge running diagonally from the outer bottom corner of each sternal plate that was oriented similarly to Dreadnoughtus and Opisthocoelicaudia.

The humerus of Patagotitan was on average 28% as broad as it was long, making it similarly robust to those of Notocolossus and Rapetosaurus but less so than those of saltasaurids. Like Dreadnoughtus, Epachthosaurus, and Opisthocoelicaudia, it was about 70% as long as the femur. A number of bulges for muscle attachment on the humerus were unique characteristics of Patagotitan. In a depression on the front upper portion of the humerus, there was a pair of scars above each other, with the top one being wider than tall and the bottom one being taller than wide; this was where the coracobrachialis muscle inserted. The ulna was robust, being about 50% as broad at the top as it was long like Dreadnoughtus, Isisaurus, Neuquensaurus, Opisthocoelicaudia, and Saltasaurus. However, the inward-pointing anteromedial process of the ulna was relatively slender, being 3.5 times as long as it was wide, and was also relatively horizontal with an angle of 40°; Patagotitan differed from Neuquensaurus in both aspects. The bottom end of the bone was mildly expanded, though not to the extent of Opisthocoelicaudia and Saltasaurus. The radius was also fairly expanded, being 36% as broad at the top as it was long. On the inner edge of the radius, a bulging scar for the attachment of the biceps brachii muscle extended towards the front of the bone as a crest, as also seen in Elaltitan (Giraffatitan and Haestasaurus exhibited the bulge without the crest).

In the hip girdle, the contact between the forward-pointing pubis and backward-pointing ischium was about half of the former's length (longer than Dreadnoughtus, Futalognkosaurus, Muyelensaurus, and Qiaowanlong) but less than half of the latter's length (common, except in Isisaurus, Malawisaurus, and saltasaurids). The articulation between the pubic bones was clearly demarcated from their articulations with other bones by deflected surfaces, as in Alamosaurus and Elaltitan. Like Uberabatitan, there was a ridge running along the side of the pubis that vanished near the obturator foramen (which was elongated like other titanosauriforms) at the top. Like Elaltitan and Futalognkosaurus but unlike Alamosaurus, the bottom of the pubic "boot" was not particularly expanded. On the side of the ischium, there was also a well-developed ridge (seen to a lesser extent in the titanosauriforms Andesaurus, Jiangshanosaurus, and Venenosaurus) extending down the ischial tuberosity (a common feature among titanosaurs) down to the blade, with the combination of these features being unique to Patagotitan. Like the humerus, the femur of Patagotitan was robust, being on average 23% as broad as it was long, similar to Rocasaurus but somewhat less than Diamantinasaurus, Opisthocoelicaudia, and Saltasaurus. Like other titanosauriforms, the head of the femur was angled upwards relative to the greater trochanter on its outer top end. Like Neuquensaurus and Rapetosaurus, a ridge ran along the back of the femur between these two features, but there was no ridge in front like Alamosaurus, Diamantinasaurus, and saltasaurines. Like Bonitasaura, Neuquensaurus, Rapetosaurus, and Saltasaurus, the fourth trochanter on the inner surface of the femur was located a third of the way from the top instead of halfway down. Uniquely among sauropods, at the outer edge of the bottom of the femur, there were a series of coarse ridges right above the articulation known as the lateral condyle; this was where the flexor digitorum longus muscle inserted.

Classification 
 
In 2017, a phylogenetic analysis by Carballido and colleagues placed Patagotitan as the sister group to its closest relative, Argentinosaurus; the two were united by the presence of long neural spines in the front back vertebrae. These two were placed within the Lognkosauria, based on the SDLs, the tall transverse processes, and small laminae that connect the neural spine to the prezygapophyses (i.e., spinoprezygapophyseal laminae or SPPLs) in the tail vertebrae of Patagotitan. The last of these characteristics were used to group lognkosaurs with Notocolossus to the exclusion of other titanosaurs, where the SPPLs of the tail vertebrae were much better-developed. Dreadnoughtus and Alamosaurus represented independent increases in body size to a much lesser extent. The group of lognkosaurs, Notocolossus, and Bonitasaura was recovered as the sister group of Rinconsauria. Lastly, unlike the results of prior analyses, the analysis of Carballido and colleagues placed Lognkosauria outside the Lithostrotia, as separate groups within the Eutitanosauria and in turn the Titanosauria. The following phylogenetic tree shows the results of their phylogenetic analysis.

Historically, the interrelationships of titanosaurs have been highly unstable and varied between different analyses. Despite this, Patagotitan has been consistently found as being grouped with Argentinosaurus and Puertasaurus in analyses including the three titanosaurs, with either one being its closest relative. In 2018, Bernardo González Riga and colleagues found Patagotitan to form a polytomy with Puertasaurus and Notocolossus, with Argentinosaurus being closest to this group; unlike Carballido and colleagues, however, they recovered the Lognkosauria within the Lithostrotia. In 2019, González Riga and colleagues recovered the same arrangement, and they named the group formed by the Lognkosauria and the Rinconsauria as Colossosauria. Also in 2019, Philip Mannion and colleagues found the group of Patagotitan, Puertasaurus, and Notocolossus in a polytomy with other titanosaurs, which included Argentinosaurus, Futalognkosaurus, Mendozasaurus, and others depending on the exclusion of some other titanosaurs from the analysis; this exclusion also affected whether Lognkosauria was inside Lithostrotia. In 2020, Carballido and colleagues found again that Patagotitan grouped with Argentinosaurus, with their grouping being in a polytomy with Puertasaurus and Drusilasaura, and Lognkosauria being outside Lithostrotia; Federico Agnolin and colleagues found a similar arrangement in 2023. In 2021, Otero and colleagues recovered the same arrangement. Also in 2021, Pablo Gallina and colleagues recovered a similar arrangement, except with Ninjatitan possibly being closer to Patagotitan and Argentinosaurus than Puertasaurus. In 2023, Agustín Pérez Moreno and colleagues performed an analysis based on that of Gallina and colleagues, and found a similar arrangement except with Ninjatitan closer to the Rinconsauria.

Due to its completeness, Carballido and colleagues in 2022 found that Patagotitan was among the most phylogenetically stable titanosaurs, with a high recuperation index of 62% (meaning that it is stable enough to not be removed due to instability in 62% of analyses) due to its firm position within the Lognkosauria. They found that the uncertainty regarding whether Lognkosauria belonged within Lithostrotia largely arose from the definition of Lithostrotia, which was based on the phylogenetically unstable Malawisaurus. Instead of using Lithostrotia, they suggested that Eutitanosauria be divided into Saltasauroidea and Colossosauria. They also refined Colossosauria as being the most inclusive group that includes Patagotitan (instead of the less stable Mendozasaurus) but not Saltasaurus. The following phylogenetic tree shows their suggested group definitions, including only the most stable titanosaurs.

Paleoecology 

Patagotitan lived in what was then a forested region. The plant fauna was dominated by conifers, with angiosperm wood being relatively rare. A new species of the angiosperm wood genus Carlquistoxylon, C. australe, was also named in 2018. 

The fine-grained sandstone and tuff-bearing siltstone sediments of the Cerro Castaño Member, from which the specimens of Patagotitan were uncovered, are indicative of low-energy water flow on a floodplain, likely related to sporadic sheet flooding. This flooding was probably too weak to transport the bones of Patagotitan, meaning that the individuals were preserved where they died. Animals from other localities in the Cerro Castaño Member include the theropod dinosaurs Tyrannotitan and Genyodectes, the peirosaurid crocodyliform Barcinosuchus, and the cryptodire turtle Chubutemys.

See also
Largest dinosaurs

References

Further reading
Meet Patagotitan, the Biggest Dinosaur Ever Found by Ed Yong, 2017

External links 
 David Attenborough and the Giant Dinosaur, BBC

Early Cretaceous dinosaurs of South America
Lithostrotians
Albian life
Late Cretaceous dinosaurs of South America
Cretaceous Argentina
Fossils of Argentina
Cerro Barcino Formation
Fossil taxa described in 2017
2014 in science
2014 in Argentina